The men's K-2 500 metres event was a pairs kayaking event conducted as part of the Canoeing at the 1996 Summer Olympics program that took place at Lake Lanier.

Medalists

Results

Heats
23 crews were entered into the event. The top three finishers from each of the three heats advanced directly to the semifinals while the remaining teams were relegated to the repechages.

Repechages
The 14 crews raced in two repechages. The top four finishers from each repechage and the fastest fifth-place finisher advanced directly to the semifinals.

Semifinals
The top four finishers in each of the two semifinals and the faster fifth-place finisher advanced to the final.

Final
The final was held on August 4.

Hungary led for the first part of the race before fading, leaving the Germans in first. Italy moved ahead fifty meters from the finish before Germany pulled even again with ten meters left to edge ahead and defend their title.

References
1996 Summer Olympics official report Volume 3. p. 167. 
Sport-reference.com 1996 men's K-2 500 m results
Wallechinsky, David and Jaime Loucky (2008). "Canoeing: Men's Kayak Pairs 500 Meters". In The Complete Book of the Olympics: 2008 Edition. London: Aurum Press Limited. p. 474.

Men's K-2 500
Men's events at the 1996 Summer Olympics